"No Hasta la Vista Tonight" is a song recorded by Canadian country music artist George Fox. It was released in 1994 as the fifth single from his fourth studio album, Mustang Heart. It peaked at number 5 on the RPM Country Tracks chart in June 1994.

Chart performance

Year-end charts

References

1993 songs
1994 singles
George Fox songs
Warner Music Group singles
Songs written by George Fox (singer)
Songs written by Bob Gaudio
Song recordings produced by Bob Gaudio